Parapoynx stratiotata, the ringed china-mark, is a moth of the family Crambidae. The species was first described by Carl Linnaeus in his 1758 10th edition of Systema Naturae. It is found in Europe  where the distribution area extends in the north to the British Isles including Ireland and in the south to Sardinia, Sicily and Greece. The species is also found across the Palearctic in North Africa, Lebanon, Turkey, Azerbaijan, Kyrgyzstan, Uzbekistan and China..

The wingspan is 20–24 mm for the males and 28–30 mm for the females. The forewings are pale ochreous brownish, sometimes partly suffused with white in disc ; lines white, first indistinct, posteriorly partly edged with dark brown, second sinuate, anteriorly suffusedly edged with dark brown ; a white discal spot, edged with dark fuscous ; a white subterminal streak. Hindwings are white; a thick dark fuscous postmedian line ; a fine dark subterminal line ; termen yellow-tinged. The larva with eight series of groups of fleshy filaments, serving as branchiae ; whitish-ochreous or pale greenish, slightly purplish freckled; dorsal line rather dark grey ; head pale brown.

The moth flies from May to September depending on the location.

The larvae feed on Nymphaea alba, Potamogeton, Callitriche, Ceratophyllum demersum, Elodea canadensis, Nuphar lutea and Stratiotes.

Subspecies
Parapoynx stratiotata stratiotata
Parapoynx stratiotata maroccanum Speidel, 1982 (Morocco)

References

External links
 Waarneming.nl 
 Lepidoptera of Belgium
 Ringed china-mark at UKMoths

Acentropinae
Moths described in 1758
Taxa named by Carl Linnaeus
Moths of Europe